Reinier Johannes Charles "Rik" Smits (born 1953 in The Hague) is a Dutch linguist, author, translator and editor with a wide range of interests.

As a linguist he specialized in generative syntax, taking a PhD in General Linguistics in 1989. From then on, he mainly pursued a writing career, informing the general public on linguistic matters theoretical and practical. Apart from linguistics, he published hundreds of articles and interviews on subjects like the brain, ICT and its ramifications, modern media, intellectual property, freedom of speech, copyright and other fundamental rights, history, ethics and politics.

Smits published books on subjects ranging from language via handedness and laterality to history and French cuisine, mostly in Dutch. Books in English comprise The Puzzle of Left-handedness, which deals with the cultural, biological and evolutionary aspects of human handedness and the notions of left, right and symmetry in biology, psychology, art and life in general, and the above-mentioned Dawn, the Origins of Language and the Modern Human Mind, an inquiry into why, how and when the human language faculty - and with it the truly modern mind - developed. For the earlier Dutch version of this book he won the LOT-award 2010. Smits shows that human language is not only truly human, representing a clear and fundamental break between "us" and the animal kingdom, and that it could not have arisen for communicative purposes - that came later.

From 2008-2015 he was the editor of De Republikein (The Republican), a quarterly on modern constitutional democracy and citizenship.

Translations include Simon Goldhill's Love, Sex and Tragedy; how the Ancient World Shapes our Lives (Liefde, seks en tragedie; hoe de oudheid ons heeft gevormd, Nieuw Amsterdam, 2012), Bill O'Reilly & Martin Dugard's Killing Kennedy; the End of Camelot (Killing Kennedy, het einde van een droom, Nieuw Amsterdam, 2012)  and Litter; how other People's Rubbish Shapes our Lives (Andermans rotzooi, Nieuw Amsterdam, 2012) by Theodore Dalrymple.

Books

References

1953 births
Living people
Dutch republicans
Linguists from the Netherlands
Science journalists
Writers from The Hague